Kåfjord Church is a parish church of the Church of Norway in Gáivuotna–Kåfjord Municipality in Troms og Finnmark county, Norway. It is located in the village of Olderdalen. It is the church for the Kåfjord parish which is part of the Nord-Troms prosti (deanery) in the Diocese of Nord-Hålogaland. The red, wooden church was built in a long church style in 1949 using plans drawn up by the architect Kirsten Sand. The church seats about 250 people.

History
The first chapel building in Kåfjord was built in 1722 in connection with the Sami mission led by Thomas von Westen. It was known as the Finnekapellet. After that time, residents would travel to the Lyngen Church, about  down the fjord. It wasn't until 1949 when Kåfjord its first official church building. Kåfjord Church was built on the initiative of the inhabitants of the village of Olderdalen who collected funds and reused materials to build it. The church was renovated in 1989-1990.

See also
List of churches in Nord-Hålogaland

References

Churches in Troms
Gáivuotna–Kåfjord
Wooden churches in Norway
20th-century Church of Norway church buildings
Churches completed in 1949
1722 establishments in Norway
Long churches in Norway